Drama por Movistar Plus+ (formerly Movistar Drama) is a Spanish television own and operated by Telefónica.

External links
Official site

Movistar+
Television stations in Spain
Television channels and stations established in 2003